Lawrence Coates is a novelist and current director of Bowling Green University's Master of Fine Arts program in creative writing.

Coates was educated at El Cerrito High School, University of California at Santa Cruz and University of Utah. He has also taught at Lycée Charlemagne and Southern Utah University.

Novels
The Blossom Festival (1999)
The Master of Monterey: A Novel (2003)
The Garden of the World (2012)
The Goodbye House (2015)
Camp Olvido (2015)

References

1950 births
Living people
American male novelists
20th-century American novelists
20th-century American male writers